In enzymology, a dimethylamine dehydrogenase is an enzyme that catalyzes the chemical reaction

dimethylamine + H2O + electron-transferring flavoprotein  methylamine + formaldehyde + reduced electron-transferring flavoprotein

The 3 substrates of this enzyme are dimethylamine, H2O, and electron-transferring flavoprotein, whereas its 3 products are methylamine, formaldehyde, and reduced electron-transferring flavoprotein.

This enzyme belongs to the family of oxidoreductases, specifically those acting on the CH-NH group of donors with a flavin as acceptor.  The systematic name of this enzyme class is dimethylamine:electron-transferring flavoprotein oxidoreductase. This enzyme participates in methane metabolism.  It employs one cofactor, FMN.

References

 

EC 1.5.8
Flavoproteins
Enzymes of unknown structure